Megasurcula howei is an extinct species of sea snail, a marine gastropod mollusk in the family Pseudomelatomidae, the turrids and allies.

Description
The length of the shell attains 36 mm, its diameter 23.6 mm.

This high-spired, biconic species differs from Megasurcula condonana (Anderson and Martin, 1914) by having a smoothly conic spire and relatively narrower body whorl. When the body whorl angulation is used as a point of reference, in non-apertural view, the upper cone of M. howei is relatively higher than the lower cone, whereas the reverse is true in specimens of the stout-shelled M. condonana. Further differences are the more acute sutural angle and the concave profile of M. condonana.

It is closely related to † Megasurcula guayasensis of the Miocene in Ecuador, but differs by being less slender, a bit taller and less finely noded.

Distribution
Fossils of this marine species have been found in Miocene strata of the Temblor Formation, California.

References

 Hanna and Hertlein, 1938, Journal of Paleontology v. 12 no. 1 p. 107

External links
 California Academy of Sciences: Megasurcula howei

howei
Gastropods described in 1938